Joseph Bernard Connell (January 16, 1902 – September 21, 1977) was a pinch hitter in Major League Baseball. He played for the New York Giants. He was the older brother of major leaguer Gene Connell.

References

External links

1902 births
1977 deaths
New York Giants (NL) players
Baseball players from Pennsylvania
Sportspeople from Bethlehem, Pennsylvania